Siah Choqai, also rendered as Siah Choqa, may refer to:
 Siah Choqai-ye Olya
 Siah Choqai-ye Sofla